Samuel Parker (born 25 November 1931) is an Australian wrestler. He competed in the men's freestyle featherweight at the 1960 Summer Olympics.

References

1931 births
Living people
Australian male sport wrestlers
Olympic wrestlers of Australia
Wrestlers at the 1960 Summer Olympics
People from Portland, Victoria